Sheikh Sulaymān al-ʿAlwān or more fully known as, Sulaymān ibn Nāṣir ibn ʿAbdullāh al-ʿAlwān, is a theoretician of militant jihad. He is known to have memorised the 9 books of Hadith with the chain of narrations known as 'Isnaad'. At a young age, he memorised a lot of texts in different Islamic sciences alongside the explanations of these texts.

Fatwa
In 2000, he issued a fatwa endorsing the use of suicide bombings against Israel, and in 2001 he supported the destruction of the Buddhas of Bamiyan by the Taliban.
Al-Alwan's mosque in Al-Qassim Province was criticised by moderate Islamic scholars as a "terrorist factory". Among his students was Abdulaziz al-Omari, one of the plane hijackers in the September 11 attacks. After the September 11 attacks, Al-Alwan issued two fatwas (21 September 2001 and 19 October 2001), in which he declared that any Muslim who supported the Americans in Afghanistan was an infidel, and called on all Muslims to support the Afghans and Taliban by any means, including jihad. In January 2002, Alwan and two other radical Saudi clerics, Hamoud al-Aqla al-Shuebi and Ali al-Khudair, wrote a letter to Taliban leader Mullah Omar praising him and referred to him as the Commander of the faithful.

Prison
On 31 March 2003, 11 days after the start of the Iraq War, al-Alwan published an open letter in which he called on the Iraqi people to fight the American soldiers and use suicide bombings against them. On 28 April 2004, Saudi authorities arrested al-Alwan and after being held for 9 years without trial, he was released on 5 December 2012.

In October 2013, Alwan was sentenced to a 15-year prison term; charges included questioning the legitimacy of the country's rulers.
He was due to be released in 2019.

See also
Nasir al-Fahd
Ali al-Khudair

References

Saudi Arabian prisoners and detainees
Saudi Arabian Sunni Muslim scholars of Islam
Living people
Salafi jihadists
Saudi Arabian Qutbists
Critics of Shia Islam
People from Buraidah
Saudi Arabian imams
Prisoners and detainees of Saudi Arabia
1969 births